A list of films produced in Argentina in 1932:

1932
Films
Argentine